Yordan Ivanov Stoykov (born 6 November 1951) is a Bulgarian professional football player and manager.

Career
Yordan Stoykov played as a defender in Lokomotiv Sofia from 1970 to 1983, as record 336 appearances for his home club. With it he became champion in 1978 and has won the Bulgarian Cup in 1982. He played in UEFA tournaments. For the youth national team has 27 games and for the Bulgaria national football team - 9 matches.

In 1979, he graduated the National Sports Academy "Vassil Levski" and began his coaching career as an assistant coach in PFC Lokomotiv Sofia from 1983 to 1985. In season 1985/1986 he was a senior coach of the PFC Balkan Botevgrad. From 1986 to 1991 he was scary coach of the youth national team. Lead the team of Al-Ittihad Club (Tripoli) in 1991/1992 and he was a senior coach of the PFC Pirin Gotse Delchev in 1992/1993, and then for two years in Tanzania (1993-1995), where local Malindi F.C. won the Tanzanian Cup and Super Cup and led the team at the seventh place at the African Club Tournaments. He was head coach of the PFC Shumen 2010 (1995/1996) and of the Shanghai Greenland Shenhua F.C. (China) in 1996-1997 and Kremikovtsi Sofia in 1997-1998.

In 1999, he became of the head coach of the Maldives national football team. In 2004, he worked at the New Radiant SC Since January 2005 until October 2007 he again coached the Maldives national team. Since July until September 2010 he trained PFC Chavdar Byala Slatina. On September 15, 2010 he named of the EEPCO F.C. head coach.

Honours
Bulgarian A Football Group:
1978

Bulgarian Cup:
1982

References

External links

Yordan Stoykov at Soccerpunter.com

1951 births
Living people
Bulgarian footballers
Bulgaria international footballers
Association football defenders
FC Lokomotiv 1929 Sofia players
First Professional Football League (Bulgaria) players
Bulgarian football managers
Maldives national football team managers
Place of birth missing (living people)
DPMM FC managers